San Xulianu is one of 54 parish councils in Cangas del Narcea, a municipality within the province and autonomous community of Asturias, in northern Spain.

Its villages include: Arbas, La Chabola, Corros, La Fonda, Xilán, Ḷḷindouta, Miravaḷḷes, Tardexugu, L'Outeiru, Rimolín, San Xulianu, San Romanu d'Arbas, Veigairrei, Veigaimiedru, Viḷḷaxer and Viḷḷar de Rogueiru.

References

Parishes in Cangas del Narcea